al-Mughayyir is a Palestinian village in the West Bank, located 12 km Southeast of the city of Jenin in the northern West Bank. According to the Palestinian Central Bureau of Statistics, the village had a population of  2,240  inhabitants in mid-year 2006.

History
In 1882,  the PEF's Survey of Western Palestine   described the village as "a small place on a rocky hill top. The water supply is by means of rain water cisterns. The houses are of stone and mud."

British Mandate era
In the 1922 census of Palestine conducted by the British Mandate authorities, Mughair had a population 94 Muslims, increasing  in the 1931 census to 156 Muslim, in  a total of 31 houses.

In  the 1945 statistics   the population was 220  Muslims, with a total of 18,049 dunams of land, according to an official land and population survey.  Of this, 711  dunams were used for plantations and irrigable land, 5,487  dunams were for cereals, while a total of  6 dunams were built-up, urban land.

Jordanian era
In the wake of the 1948 Arab–Israeli War, and after the 1949 Armistice Agreements,  Al-Mughayyir came under Jordanian rule.

In 1961, the population was  390.

Post-1967
Since the Six-Day War in 1967, Al-Mughayyir has been under Israeli occupation.

References

Bibliography

External links
Welcome To al-Mughaiyir
Survey of Western Palestine, Map 9: IAA, Wikimedia commons 

Villages in the West Bank
Jenin Governorate
Municipalities of the State of Palestine